The IP500 Alliance with seat in Berlin is an international organization of manufacturers of products and systems for the building automation (e.g. Bosch, Honeywell, Siemens, OMRON, TOYOTA TSUSHO, in addition, medium-size enterprises), of system integrators as well as of operators of buildings and industrial plants. A goal of the IP500 Alliance is it to define with the IP500 communication platform a wireless (Wireless), manufacturer-neutral and safe data transfer for large buildings to develop and make available for it a “turn key module”.

The Alliance was created 2007 in Berlin from OEM´s as Interest Group and could win numerous international cooperation partners, among other things enterprises such as TÜV Rhineland, EBV or VARTA. Since 2011 the IP500® Alliance is an official “None profit” organization, on the basis of a registered association (e.V. after German law).

References

Building automation
Home automation
Trade associations based in Germany